Albert Henry Washburn (1866–April 29, 1930) was a non-career appointee who served as the American Envoy Extraordinary and Minister Plenipotentiary to Austria from 1922 until his death on April 29, 1930.

Biography
Washburn was born in Middleborough, Massachusetts to Edward and Ann (White) Washburn.  He graduated from Cornell University in 1889 and joined the Consular Service in 1890.  He earned a LL.B. from Georgetown University after transferring from the University of Virginia in 1895.  In 1897, he was appointed Assistant U.S. District Attorney in Massachusetts but transferred to the U.S. Treasury Department in 1900.  He left in 1905 to go into private practice. In 1919, he received his A.M. from Dartmouth College and the following year, joined their faculty as a professor of political science and international law.  In 1922, he arbitrated the Austrian-Yugoslavian Commercial Dispute.

References

Cornell University alumni
People from Middleborough, Massachusetts
Georgetown University Law Center alumni
University of Virginia School of Law alumni
Dartmouth College alumni
Dartmouth College faculty
Assistant United States Attorneys
Ambassadors of the United States to Austria
1866 births
1930 deaths